Hallgeir Pedersen (born 24 May 1973 in Tromsø, Norway) is a Norwegian jazz guitarist, well known for his Thorgeir Stubø, Wes Montgomery and Coltrane inspired bop guitar performances and recordings like West Coast Blues (2002) with his own trio.

Career
Pedersen was raised in Øksfjord, a small village in Finnmark, northern Norway, and started early playing heavy-metal guitar, inspired by guitarists like Ritchie Blackmore, Ronni Le Tekrø, and Yngwie Malmsteen. The latter led him to study the music of Johann Sebastian Bach, and classical guitar studies on the music program at Holstbakken videregående skole in Alta (1989–92). During this period he became interested in bebop, and he was introduced to the work of the renowned Norwegian jazz guitarist Thorgeir Stubø (1943–1986). His first jazz band was the Alta Jazz Trio, with a festival debut at the Varanger Festival in 1995. Later he joined bassist Dag Erik Pedersen in Romanian pianist Constantin "Nuti" Tănase's trio. Pedersen had already developed a distinct guitar style performing mostly in northern Norway.

Pedersen started the jazz band Bebop Guitars in 1998, with another guitarist Øystein Norvoll. This band represented Nordnorsk Jazzforum at their 25 anniversary, performing at Festspillene i Nord-Norge in 1999. He  was discovered by a broader audience when presented at NRK by jazz host Erling Wicklund, his first feature radio concert live with Bebop Guitars at Nordland Musikkfestuke in Bodø for NRK P2. After this he was often referred to as "Norway's new king of bebop guitar" and "The Phantom of Øksfjord", in the Norwegian jazz press.

From 1999 he led the Hallgeir Pedersen Trio with Trond Sverre Hansen (drums) and Konrad Kaspersen (double bass). With the support of Norsk jazzforum they toured Norway in 2001, including the Trondheim Jazz Festival and recorded their first album West Coast Blues at the jazz club Blå in Oslo (2002). The release has received glowing chalk security in among others jazz magazine: Orkesterjournalen (no 1, 2003) and U.S. magazine Just jazz Guitar (no 5, 2003). Here he interpreted compositions by Wes Montgomery and Kenny Burrell. Pedersen was in 2002 the first recipient of Randi Hultin Memorial Award. On the second album from his trio, Wistful (2004) he interpreted the ballad, "Theme for Thorgeir", dedicated to his guitar hero Thorgeir Stubø. Bluero (2006), was recorded in Rainbow Studio with Jan Erik Kongshaug mastering the sound.

His trio cooperated with the electronic band Bol for the NRK radio contribution to The EBU, "Jazz around the world" in 2003.  This concert was broadcast to 18 countries. Here with bassist Steinar Raknes. Later Bjørn Alterhaug has been bassist of the trio on the albums Wistful (2004) and Bluero (2006), receiving ensemble support from Norsk Kulturråd in 2005, appeared at Moldejazz the same year, and at Vossajazz in 2006.

Pedersen has been a soloist with numerous ensembles, among them the Norsk Universal Orkester in 2003 (led by Lars Erik Gudim), at the Jubileums-varitéet, at Kongsberg Jazz Festival in 2004, and with the Sami artist Ingor Ánte Áilo Gaup (Áillos) at the Riddu Riđđu Festival (2003). He has collaborated on several of the projects with trumpeter Tore Johansen, including as a member of the Lars Gullin Tribute (2004–05). His guitar is heard on the third album from trumpeter Johansen, Windows (2003) with Roger Johansen on drums and Ole Morten Vågan on bass. Pedersen was selected to represent Norway at the International Bebop Guitar-meeting in 2006, along with a number of internationally formatted guitar counterparts, like Louis Stewart (Ireland), Martin Taylor (England) og Randy Johnston (USA).

Pedersen has from 2003 led a quartet with the Swedish saxophonist Bernt Rosengren, appearing on the Nordlysfestivalen in Tromsø, Nattjazz in Bergen, and Oslo Jazz Festival in 2003 (NRK P2 feature radio concert). In 2006, the Finnish alto saxophonist Jukka Perko, joined in for the commissioned work at Dølajazz. He has also cooperated in a Quartet with pianist Ivar Antonsen. At Moldejazz in 2005, he was described as "Jazz guitarist of ultimate format with a characteristic play."

Pedersen's latest project, Flight, is a quartet that includes Ivar Antonsen (piano), Bjørn Alterhaug (bass) and Roger Johansen (drums). Flight has received excellent reviews for their album Flight Dec.17.

In 2010 and 2011 Hallgeir Pedersen was the musical leader for The Groove Valley Jazzcamp in Beiarn, Norway and in 2012 he will have the same responsibility for the UrBand Camp who will be arranged for first time in Arkhangelsk, Russia.

Honors
Randi Hultin Memorial Award 2002
Stubøprisen 2007

Discography

Solo albums 
Within Hallgeir Pedersen Trio
2002: West Coast Blues (Ponca Jazz), with Konrad Kaspersen and Trond Sverre Hansen
2004: Wistful (Hot Club Records), with Bjørn Alterhaug and Trond Sverre Hansen
2006: Bluero (Ponca Jazz), with Bjørn Alterhaug and Trond Sverre Hansen

Collaborations 
Within Flight (Quartet – Ivar Antonsen, Bjørn Alterhaug and Tore Johansen)
2010:Flight 17 Dec. (Ponca Jazz)

With Tore Johansen (Quartet – Ole Morten Vågan and Roger Johansen)
2003: Windows (Gemini Music)

With Terje Nilsen
2012: Gledeståra (Inner Ear)

References

External links

Ponca Jazz Records Official Website
"HALLGEIR PEDERSEN / PER MATHISEN" DUO, "IMPRESSIONS" at YouTube

Norwegian jazz composers
Norwegian jazz guitarists
Hot Club Records artists
Ponca Jazz Records artists
Musicians from Finnmark
1973 births
Living people
21st-century Norwegian guitarists
People from Loppa